Pierre Marie Heude (25 June 1836 – 3 January 1902) was a French Jesuit missionary and zoologist.

Life
Born at Fougères in the Department of Ille-et-Vilaine, Heude became a Jesuit in 1856 and was ordained to the priesthood in 1867. He went to China in 1868. During the following years, he devoted all his time and energy to the studies of the natural history of Eastern Asia, traveling widely in China and other parts of Eastern Asia.

The first fruits of his research concern the mollusks: his Conchyliologie fluviatile de la province de Nanking (et de la Chine centrale) was published in Paris between 1876 and 1885 in 10 volumes; his Notes sur le mollusques terrestres de la vallée du Fleuve Bleu can be found in the first volume of the Mémoires concernant l'histoire naturelle de l'Empire Chinois, founded by the Jesuits of Xujiahui, Shanghai in 1882. Later he turned his attentions to mammals.

With his remarkable collection of specimens, he helped to set up a museum of natural history at Xujiahui in 1868, the first of its kind in China. (The museum had been known later as Musée Heude, but was incorporated into other museums since the 1950s.) He continued his scientific works until his death at Xujiahui.

Bibliography
  Heude P. M. (1875–1885). Conchyliologie fluviatile de la province de Nanking et de la Chine centrale. Paris. 10 volumes. another scan - this whole work is about freshwater bivalves of China
  Heude P. M. (1882–1890). "Notes sur les Mollusques terrestres de la vallée du Fleuve Bleu". Mémoires concernant l'histoire naturelle de l'empire chinois par des pères de la Compagnie de Jésus, Mision Catholique, Chang-Hai.
 (1882). 2: 1-88, plates 12-21.
 (1885). 3: 89-132, plates 22-32.
 (1890). 4: 125[sic]-188, plates 33-43.

See also

List of Jesuit scientists
List of Roman Catholic scientist-clerics

References

Further reading 
 Kobelt W. (1902). "Necrologie". Nachrichtsblatt der Deutschen Malakozoologischen Gesellschaft 34(11-12): 215.
 Johnson R. (ed.) (1973). "Heude's Molluscan Types, or Asian land and fresh water mollusks, mostly from the People's Republic of China, described by P. Heude". Cambridge, Spec. Occ. Publ. 4, 111 pp.

External links
Biography at Catholic Encyclopedia

1836 births
1902 deaths
People from Fougères
French Roman Catholic missionaries
19th-century French zoologists
French malacologists
19th-century French Jesuits
Conchologists
Jesuit missionaries in China
Roman Catholic missionaries in China
Jesuit scientists
Jesuit missionaries
French expatriates in China
Museum founders